Muhammad Ali Jauhar (10 December 1878 – 4 January 1931), was an Indian Muslim activist, prominent member of the All-India Muslim League, Indian National Congress, journalist and a poet, a leading figure of the Khilafat Movement and one of the founders of Jamia Millia Islamia.

Jauhar was a member of the Aligarh Movement. He was elected to become the President of Indian National Congress party in 1923 and it lasted only for a few months. He was also one of the founders and 14th president of the All-India Muslim League.

Early life and career
Mohammad Ali was born in 1878 in Najibabad, Rampur State. He was born to a rich family belonging to the Yusufzai clan. His father, Abdul Ali Khan, died when he was five years old. His brothers were Shaukat, who became a leader of the Khilafat Movement, and Zulfiqar. His mother Abadi Begum (1852–1924), affectionately known as Bi Amman, inspired her sons to take up the mantle of the struggle for freedom from Colonial rule. To this end, was adamant that her sons were properly educated.

Despite the early death of his father, Jauhar attended Aligarh Muslim University and the Allahabad University, in 1898, Lincoln College, Oxford, studying modern history.

Upon his return to India, he served as education director for the Rampur state, and later joined the Baroda civil service. He became a writer and an orator of the first magnitude and a farsighted political leader, writing articles in major British and Indian newspapers like The Times, London, The Manchester Guardian and The Observer. He launched the English weekly The Comrade in 1911 in Calcutta. It quickly gained circulation and influence. He moved to Delhi in 1912 and there he launched an Urdu-language daily newspaper Hamdard in 1913. He married Amjadi Bano Begum (c. 1886–1947) in 1902. Amjadi Begum was actively involved in the national and Khilafat movement.

Jauhar worked hard to expand the Aligarh Muslim University, then known as the Muhammadan Anglo-Oriental College, and was one of the co-founders of the Jamia Millia Islamia in 1920, which was later moved to Delhi.

Khilafat movement in India

Jauhar had attended the founding meeting of the All India Muslim League in Dacca in 1906, and served as its president in 1918. He remained active in the League till 1928. Jauhar  "had the unique distinction of having directed the affairs of the three most important political parties/movements in the country—The Indian National Congress, the All India Muslim League and the Khilafat movement."

He represented the Muslim delegation that travelled to England in 1919 to convince the British government to influence the Turkish nationalist Mustafa Kemal not to depose the Sultan of Turkey, who was the Caliph of Islam and the presumed leader of all Islamic nations of that time. British government's rejection of their demands resulted in the formation of the Khilafat committee which directed Muslims all over India to protest and boycott the British government.

In 1921, Jauhar formed a broad coalition with nationalist leaders like Shaukat Ali, Abul Kalam Azad, Hakim Ajmal Khan, Mukhtar Ahmed Ansari, Syed Ata Ullah Shah Bukhari as well as Mahatma Gandhi, who then enlisted the support of the Indian National Congress and many thousands of Hindus, who joined the Muslims in a demonstration of unity against the British government. Jauhar  also wholeheartedly supported Gandhi's call for a national civil resistance movement, and inspired many hundreds of protests and strikes all over India. He was arrested by British authorities and imprisoned for two years for what was termed as a seditious speech at the meeting of the Khilafat Conference.

Alienation from Congress
Jauhar was, however, disillusioned by the failure of the Khilafat movement and Gandhi's suspension of non-cooperation movement in 1922, owing to the Chauri Chaura incident. In this incident, on 4 February 1922, when a large group of protesters, participating in Gandhi's non-cooperation movement clashed with police, who opened fire and killed three protesters. In retaliation, the demonstrators attacked and set fire to a police station, killing 22 policemen. The Indian National Congress suspended the non-cooperation movement on the national level as a direct result of this incident.

He restarted his daily Hamdard, and left the Congress Party. He opposed the Nehru Report, which was a document proposing constitutional reforms and a dominion status of an independent nation within the British Empire, written by a committee of Hindu and Muslim members of the Congress Party headed by President Motilal Nehru. It was a major protest against the Simon Commission which had arrived in India to propose reforms but containing no local Indian nor making any effort to listen to the Indians' voices and aspirations. Mohammad Ali was put in jail. So All Parties Conference on Nehru report was represented by Shaukat Ali, Begum Mohammad Ali and 30 other members of the Central Khilafat Committee which included Abdul Majid Daryabadi, Azad Subhani, Maghfoor Ahmad Ajazi, Abul Muhasin Muhammad Sajjad and others. Mohammad Ali opposed the part of the Nehru Report's 'rejection' of separate electorates for Muslims, and supported the Fourteen Points of Muhammad Ali Jinnah and the Muslim League. He became a critic of Gandhi, breaking with fellow Muslim leaders like Abul Kalam Azad, Hakim Ajmal Khan and Mukhtar Ahmed Ansari, who continued to support Gandhi and the Indian National Congress.

Imprisonment in Karachi
In 1921, the British government established a court in Khaliqdina Hall in Karachi and punished him with two-and-a-half years' imprisonment in Karachi central jail. Besides this jail sentence, he served many and frequent jail sentences due to his anti-government activities. However, he kept fighting for the Muslim League.

1930 Round Table Conference in London 
Ultimately Mohammad Ali's frequent jail sentences, his diabetes and lack of proper nutrition while jailed, made him very sick. Despite his failing health, he wanted to attend the first Round Table Conference held in London in 1930. Ali attended the 'Conference' in London (the chairman being Sir Agha Khan of the Muslim delegation) to show that only the Muslim League spoke for India's Muslims. Reportedly his words to the British government were that he would not return to India alive unless the country was set free, "I would prefer to die in a foreign country so long as it is a free country, and if you do not give us freedom in India, you will have to give me a grave here."

Death and legacy

He died of a stroke in London on 4 January 1931 and was buried in Jerusalem by the choice of his relatives, friends and admirers. The inscription on his grave in the Khātūniyya Madrasa, which is near the Dome of the Rock, says: "Here lies al-Sayyid Muhammad Ali al-Hindi." Pakistan Postal Services issued a commemorative postage stamp for Jauhar in its 'Pioneers of Freedom' series on his birth anniversary in 1978. A number of educational intuitions like Mohammad Ali Jauhar University in Rampur, India, Maulana Mohammad Ali Jauhar Academy of International Studies in Jamia Millia Islamia in Delhi, India, Maulana Mohammad Ali College in Bangladesh and places including Johar Town, Jauharabad, Gulistan-e-Jauhar in Pakistan are named after Jauhar. A house in Cadat college Ormara is named after Maulana Mohammad Ali Jou
har to remember the great hero and give inspiration to the youth

In popular culture 
Maulana Mohammad Ali 'Jauhar' is a 1984 documentary film directed by Saiyed Ahmad and produced by the Government of India's Films Division, it covers his political career and life as an Indian freedom fighter.

Speeches

"I had long been convinced that here in this Country of hundreds of millions of human beings, intensely attached to religion, and yet infinitely split up into communities, sects and denominations, Providence had created for us the mission of solving a unique problem and working out a new synthesis, which was nothing low than a Federation of Faiths … For more than twenty years I have dreamed the dream of a federation, grander, nobler and infinitely more spiritual than the United States of America, and today when many a political Cassandra prophesies a return to the bad old days of Hindu-Muslim dissensions I still dream that old dream of 'United Faiths of India.'" —Mohammad Ali Jauhar; from the Presidential Address, I.N.C. Session, 1923, Cocanada (now Kakinada).
However later, he started proposing the concept of Pakistan.

References

External links 

Biographical pages
 
 
 , Retrieved 4 January 2017
 , Retrieved 4 January 2017
 

1878 births
1931 deaths
Aligarh Muslim University alumni
Alumni of Lincoln College, Oxford
Indian independence activists from Uttar Pradesh
Presidents of the Indian National Congress
People from Rampur, Uttar Pradesh
Translators of the Quran into Urdu
20th-century Indian Muslims
Jamia Millia Islamia
Rohilkhand
Founders of Indian schools and colleges
Prisoners and detainees of British India
Indian editors
Indian male journalists
Indian male poets
20th-century Indian journalists
Journalists from Uttar Pradesh
Leaders of the Pakistan Movement
People from Bijnor district